The 2019 Africa U-17 Cup of Nations is an international age-restricted football tournament which is currently being held in Tanzania from 14–28 April. The 8 representative teams involved in the tournament were required to register a squad of 21 players, including three goalkeepers. Only players born or after 1 January 2002 are eligible to be registered in these squads, only players registered in the squads are eligible to take part in the tournament.

Players in boldface have been capped at full international level at some point in their career.

Group A

Tanzania
Head coach: Oscar Mirambo

Nigeria
Head coach: Manu Garba

Angola
Head coach:  Pedro Gonçalves

Uganda
Head coach:  Samuel Fabin

Group B

Guinea
Head coach: Mohamed Maleah Camara

Cameroon
Head coach: Thomas Libiih

Morocco
Head coach: Jamal Sellami

Senegal
Head coach: Malick Daf

References

2019 Africa U-17 Cup of Nations